Richard Lindsay Hesketh (born 30 March 1988) is an English medical doctor and a former first-class cricketer.

Hesketh was born at Cambridge in March 1988. He was educated in Cambridge at The Perse School, before going up to Cardiff University to study medicine. From there he studied for his doctorate at Christ's College, Cambridge. While studying at Cambridge, he made two appearances in first-class cricket in 2010, playing one match apiece for Cambridge MCCU against Leicestershire at Fenner's and for Cambridge University against Oxford University in The University Match at Oxford. He scored 38 runs in these two matches, with a high score of 20.

Notes and references

External links

1988 births
Living people
Cricketers from Cambridgeshire
Sportspeople from Cambridge
People educated at The Perse School
Alumni of Cardiff University
Alumni of Christ's College, Cambridge
English cricketers
Cambridge MCCU cricketers
Cambridge University cricketers
21st-century English medical doctors